Real Club España is a Mexican sports club located in Mexico City. The club hosted a large variety of sports and other activities such as aerobics, basque pelota, billiards, canoeing, climbing wall, football, gymnastics, jai alai, mountaineering, paddle tennis, paleta frontón, rowing, Spanish dances, squash, swimming, tennis, volleyball, weightlifting.

The club was mostly known for its football senior team that played in the Primera División de México until it disaffiliated from the league in 1950. During the Era romántica (Romantic era) of Mexican football, Club España was one of the most popular teams, winning 14 league titles and 4 Copa Mexico in the amateur years (1902–1943) of the sport in that country. After the professionalization of football, España won another 2 major titles, the 1943–44 Copa Mexico where they beat Atlante 6–2 in the final, and the overall league championship in 1944–45 ahead of Puebla F.C. under manager Rodolfo Muñoz.

History

Beginnings

España club was founded 20 March 1912, product of a separation of the previous club Mexico FC which had been founded on 1910 by Alfredo B. Cuellar, Jorge Gómez de Parada and Alberto Montaña . In San Pedro of the Pines Cricket was the main sport, two years later, in order to play football, 6 young Spanish emigrants would undertake the project to create a new club and would form Real Club España. Francisco Aryan, Ramon Lance, Pedro Batgay, Delio Bonet, Enrique Escalada and Francisco Gómez were the founders.

Success
España's success began immediately, the year after the foundation the club won its first league title in 1914 they won their first double but it would not stop there, the club won a total of 14 amateur league championships and four cups between 1912 and the professionalisation of Mexican football in 1943.

When the professional Primera División de México was created in 1943, Real España Club was one of the favourites but they lost the title to Asturias F.C. The next season 1944–45 saw the club win championship number 15. Nevertheless, this title and the Cup obtained in 1943 against Atlante would be the only trophies obtained by España in the professional era. In 1950 the España football team retired from Mexican first division.

Atlético Español
For the season 1971–72 Club Necaxa was taken over by Spanish directors. With the intention to remember the great team that was the España Club, they decide to change to the name of the team to Atlético Español, even copying the colors of the uniform of the defunct team. The name change was never popularly accepted and after 10 years it was changed back to Necaxa.

Present time
At present Real España still exists. Their facilities continue to operate in Mexico City and—aside from football—the club offers members the option to take part in several sporting activities including rowing and tennis, among others. Its professional football program has been left in the past and only some fields, photographs and trophies survive.

España B
Amid the controversy Germania was accepted to play in the league. Germania was composed of German players who had come to Mexico. Rumors were that Amicale Française and Reforma had quit the league due to Germans being allowed in the league. The true reason was that during this time World War I was occurring in Europe causing French and English in Mexico went back to their country to contribute in their respective armies. Mexico posed as a neutral country so that was the reason why Germania had been allowed to join. During the 1915–16 season of the Primera Fuerza España B began playing and was composed of extra players from Club España.

Primera Fuerza
These are all the statistics from the club's participation in the Primera Fuerza from 1912–1943 except for the 1921–22 and the 1930–31 tournament which was not held.

After the 1942–43 tournament the league was professionalism and changed its name to the Liga Mayor.

Historic Badges

Honours
 Liga Mexicana de Fútbol Amateur Association (14): 1913–14, 1914–15, 1915–16, 1916–17, 1918–19, 1919–20, 1920–21, 1921–22, 1923–24, 1929–30, 1933–34, 1935–36, 1939–40, 1941–42
 Copa México (5): 1914–15, 1916–17, 1917–18, 1918–19, 1943–44
 Match "of the Centenario" (1): 1921
 Primera División (1): 1944–45
Campeón de Campeones (2): 1944, 1945

References

External links

 Official website

E
E
E
E
E
E
E
Primera Fuerza teams
Association football clubs disestablished in 1950
Diaspora sports clubs
Spanish-Mexican culture